Bhante Henepola Gunaratana is a Sri Lankan Theravada Buddhist monk. He is affectionately known as Bhante G. Bhante Gunaratana is currently the abbot of the Bhavana Society, a monastery and meditation retreat center that he founded in High View, West Virginia in 1985.

Early life 
Henepola Gunaratana was born Ekanayaka Mudiyanselage Ukkubanda on December 7, 1927, in the small Sri Lankan village of Henepola. At 7, he began attending a school run by Catholic missionary nuns in Medagama. It was the closet school to his home, and attracted many students as they provided them with a warm meal. A year later, Gunaratana would switch to the new primary school opened by the Buddhist temple in Dehideniya.

After four years he left formal education at 11 in order to train for a noviceship at a temple in Kosinna, Rambukkana District. However this initial novitiate was cut short. Three months later, he was brought home by his father when a letter was sent saying that one of the temple youths had injured Gunaratana's wrist with a rock. He remained home for short time before leaving again, in January 1939, for another temple in Malandeniya Village, Kurunegala District. Impressing his teacher, Venerable Kiribatkumbure Sonuttara Mahathera, with the progress of his religious education he was soon ordained as a novice at 12 with the permission of his father. His preceptor for the ceremony was the oldest monk in the district, Venerable Alagoda Sumanatissa Nayaka Mahathera.

Gunaratana would go on to receive upasampada in 1947, at the age of 20, in Kandy. He took his ordained name, Henepola Gunaratana, in the Sinhalese custom. The first name denoting his birthplace, and the surname a spiritual concept. He was then educated at Vidyasekhara Pirivena Junior College, a monks school in Gampaha. He received his higher education in Sri Lanka at Vidyalankara College in Kelaniya and the Buddhist Missionary College (an affiliate of the Maha Bodhi Society) in Colombo.

Missionary work
After his education, he was sent to India for missionary work as a representative of the Maha Bodhi Society. He primarily served the Untouchables in Sanchi, Delhi, and Bombay. During this time in India, through his work with the Venerable Pannatissa, Gunaratana met with several dignitaries such as Prime Minister Nehru, Mahendra of Nepal, and the Dalai Lama over the course of 1956. He also went on to serve as a religious advisor to the Malaysian Sasana Abhivurdhiwardhana Society, Buddhist Missionary Society, and Buddhist Youth Federation. Following this he served as an educator for Kishon Dial School and Temple Road Girls' School. He was also the principal of the Buddhist Institute of Kuala Lumpur.

Life in the United States
Bhante Gunaratana first arrived in the United States, at the age of 40, on the invitation of the Sasana Sevaka Society in 1968. He served as the General Secretary of the Buddhist Vihara Society of Washington, D.C. He was elected president of the society twelve years later. While serving in this office, he has conducted meditation retreats and taught courses in Buddhist Studies. During this time, he entered the local American University and earned a Bachelor's of Philosophy in 1975. He also served as the first Buddhist chaplain on the university's campus in 1972 while still a student.

Assistance of Vietnamese Refugees, 1975 
In May 1975 after graduating, the State Department reached out to Bhante Gunaratana at the conculsion of the Vietnam War to comfort and minister to ten thousand newly arrived Vietnamese refugees in Florida. Over the next four months at Eglin Air Force Base, Gunaratana held devotional services, English classes, and gave blessings to newlyweds at the refugee camp. He also did much to locate American sponsors for these refugees who would keep the families together so that they would not have to be separated.

Further Education and Teaching 
Following this period Gunaratana returned to Washington D.C. and went on to earn a Master's, and Doctorate of Philosophy in 1980 from American University. In the 1980s, Gunaratana began to teach graduate level courses on Buddhism at American University, Georgetown, Bucknell, and the University of Maryland, College Park. He has also lectured at universities throughout the greater United States, Europe, and Australia.

Published works
 
 
 
 
 
 
  (commentary on the Satipatthana Sutta)
  (commentary on the Girimananda Sutta)

References

External links

Bhante Henepola Gunaratana
Bhante Gunaratana's books at Wisdom Publications

Theravada Buddhism writers
Sri Lankan Buddhists
Sri Lankan Buddhist missionaries
Sri Lankan expatriates in the United States
Theravada Buddhist monks
American University alumni
People from Hampshire County, West Virginia
Sri Lankan Theravada Buddhists
Sri Lankan Buddhist monks
1927 births
Living people
Mindfulness (Buddhism)